Miss Earth Cayman Islands is a national beauty pageant, to represent Cayman Islands at the Miss Earth pageant.

Titleholders

See also
Miss Cayman Islands

External links
Miss Earth official website

Beauty pageants in the Cayman Islands
Recurring events established in 2006
Caymanian awards
2006 establishments in the Cayman Islands